Neuronal acetylcholine receptor subunit beta-4 is a protein that in humans is encoded by the CHRNB4 gene.

Interactive pathway map

See also
 Nicotinic acetylcholine receptor

References

Further reading

External links 
 
 

Ion channels
Nicotinic acetylcholine receptors